Madison Wilson (born 4 December 1999) is an Australian female canoeist who was 6th with Georgina Collin in the C2 sprint senior final at the 2019 Wildwater Canoeing World Championships.

Achievements

References

External links
 

1999 births
Living people
Australian female canoeists
Place of birth missing (living people)